Sir Philip Watts  (30 May 1846 – 15 March 1926) was a British naval architect, famous for designing numerous Elswick cruisers and the revolutionary battleship HMS Dreadnought.

Early life
Watts was born in Deptford, Kent and educated at the Dockyard School in Portsmouth and the Royal School of Naval Architecture in South Kensington, London.

Career
Watts became a constructor to the Admiralty from 1870 to 1885, and reached the rank of chief constructor. From 1885 to 1901 he was director of the war shipping department of Armstrong Whitworth at Elswick (subsequently returning as a director of the company in 1912); but in 1902 he was appointed Director of Naval Construction at the Admiralty. He held this post until 1912, when he was succeeded by Eustace Tennyson d'Eyncourt and became adviser to the Admiralty on naval construction. In this capacity he played an important part when World War I came.

Being the designer of the first dreadnought battleship, it was now up to him to see the use that was made of the fleet which he had brought into being in previous years. In 1912, he was appointed to the Royal Commission on Fuel and Engines.

Watts was a keen volunteer, and a commanding officer of the 1st Northumberland Artillery Volunteers.

In June 1900 he was elected a Fellow of the Royal Society and was vice-president in 1915–1916. He was created KCB in 1905.

Ships designed
Armstrong Whitworth
 NMS Elisabeta,  Romanian Navy, 1887
 s,  Regia Marina, 1887–1889
 ,  Regia Marina, 1887–1889
 Republica,  Brazilian Navy, 1892
 ARA Veinticinco de Mayo,  Argentine Navy, 1890
 ARA Nueve de Julio,  Argentine Navy, 1892
 Japanese cruiser Yoshino,  Imperial Japanese Navy, 1892
 Esmeralda,  Chilean Navy, 1895
 USS New Orleans (CL-22), United States Navy, 1895
 Almirante Barroso,  Brazilian Navy
 Yashima,  Imperial Japanese Navy, 1896
 O'Higgins,  Chilean Navy, 1897
 Asama,  Imperial Japanese Navy, 1898
 Tokiwa,  Imperial Japanese Navy, 1898
 USS Albany (CL-23), United States Navy, 1898
 Dom Carlos I,  Portuguese Navy, 1898
 HNoMS Norge,  Royal Norwegian Navy, 1899
 HNoMS Eidsvold,  Royal Norwegian Navy, 1899
 Hatsuse,  Imperial Japanese Navy, 1899
 Izumo,  Imperial Japanese Navy, 1899
 Iwate,  Imperial Japanese Navy, 1900

Royal Navy
 
 
 Lord Nelson-class battleships

Family and later life
Watts married Elise Isabelle Simonau, daughter of Chevalier Gustave Simonau. They had two daughters.
He died in 1926 and is buried in Brompton Cemetery.

Notes

External links
 
 Obituary

1846 births
1926 deaths
Knights Commander of the Order of the Bath
British naval architects
Presidents of the Smeatonian Society of Civil Engineers
Burials at Brompton Cemetery
Fellows of the Royal Society